Wladimiro Politano (February 19, 1940 Lago (Cosenza), Italy) is an Italian sculptor, painter and drawer.

Politano's work has been exhibited in the United States, Latin America and Europe.

Background 
Born in Italy, Politano graduated from the Accademia di Belle Arti di Roma. He lived in Rome until 1966, when he moved to Caracas, Venezuela. Seven years later he went to New York where he lived for ten years. During this period of time Politano participated in different public and private exhibitions in the United States, Austria, Japan, Venezuela and Italy.

In 1978, the Vienna Künstlerhaus invited Politano to celebrate the One Hundred Years of the Künstlerhause Museum.  In July 1980, the city of New Rochelle N.Y. awarded him the title “Commendatio ”.

In 1981, Politano helped inaugurate the Museum of Modern Art, Toyama Toyama-Shi, Japan.  The museum has two Politano paintings are present in permanent exhibition. In Florida, he received the Sylvia Daro Dawidowicz International Award.

In 1983, Politano returns to Caracas to work with both private and public projects. He participated in Caracas to "Escultura Symposium 1985" and his model remained as a symbol of the "VIII Biennale of Architecture" in the "Museo de Bellas Artes" . This sculpture is called "Puntas de Plata" and is in permanent exhibition at the Caracas's Metro, Station "El Silencio”. Politano in this period lived and worked between Venezuela, Italy and Sweden.

In 2003, Politan was invited as a curator and artist to participate in the "II Biennial of Painting" in Konstgall Väsby, Stockholm, Sweden.  He was invited to the first International Sculpture Symposium 2007 SIEIM made in 'Margarita Island, Nueva Esparta Venezuela. Politano received "The Italy in the World Award" from the President of Italy.

Today, Politano lives between Caracas, Rome, Lago-Calabria and Stockholm.

Critics
“Wladimiro Politano is essentially Latin due to his Italian origin, and Latin American because of his life and work in Venezuela and the realismo mágico (magical realism) present in his painting –a type of expression considered as pragmatic and definitive of Latin American fabulist imagination. One cannot disregard what lingers of New York in the artist, since he lived for ten years in this city, where his work was exhibited many times. Therefore, Politano’s art is literally a globalized art, although it is envisioned from Venezuela.
In the present phase of his production, distant already from Geometric Abstractionism (except in some of his steel sculptures), Politano has matured a new artistic language, proper, very personal, enriched by a coherent formal vocabulary and a thematic repertoire that centers on the human figure. It is a non-realistic figure, not intended to describe its visual appearance or to serve in analytic speculation, but to allude, lyrically. To a general human condition in the midst of unreal and metaphoric scenes.
These paintings move about in an atmosphere of deferred effusiveness, of watchfulness, of doubt, of silence, of coldness. Yet, inside, there is a burning fire perceived in the images, affording them a secret and intense underlying life.”

”Today is a great day for the artist that we have the honour to introduce to you; a great day for Politano, since it becomes visible that a new era of rewards to his efforts begins, his desire to project himself in an international way taking with him, as Italian-Venezuelan, the Italian and Venezuelan flags interweaved, with his message of humanity, faith and peace to the whole world.
With great modesty, one of his characteristics, that is well known by all those living near him, he wants to pay his respects and gratefulness to Venezuela, very much loved foster country, where under its purest tropical lights he received his creative inspiration with which he later created his work of art; also to all his friends and art collectors, that had and unbreakable faith in him and his art from the beginning of his career. This new stage in Politano´s art offer an extraordinary sensitive strength, a complete security in the composition of volume, the plastic balance and a personal style that expresses the honesty of the emotions and the absolute control of the craft. Is our sincere conviction that this sample of Politano´s art will get through to the hearts of those that contemplate it and for those searching something more than plane sympathetic co-efficiency in a picture, this exhibition will fill with complete satisfaction the lovers of today’s modern art.“

Museum
 Künstlerhause Museum of Vienna. Vienna, Austria.
 Museum Bennington College. Bennington. Vermont, USA.
Museum Modern Art Toyoma. Shingogaura. Toyama-Shi. Japan.
 Sylvia Daro Dawidowicz International Foundation. Florida, USA.
Metropolitan Museum of Art, Coral Gable. Florida, USA.
 John J. Koubeck Foundation, University of Miami. Florida, USA.
 Museum "Bellas Arte”. Caracas, Venezuela.
 Museum of Contemporary Art Sofia Imber. Caracas, Venezuela.
 Museum of Rende, Municipality of Rende. Rende, Cosenza, Italy.
Museum of Latin American Art (MOLAA). Long Beach. California, USA.
 Museum of Contemporary Art. Panamá
 Museum of Art Acarigua Araure. MAAA. Acarigua. Edo. Portuguesa, Venezuela

Awards
Accademia di Belle Arti di Roma. Italia, 1966.
 "Mention of Honor". Valencia's Ateneo. Salon XXIII. Valencia, Venezuela 1970.
 Merit Honor "Commendation", given by the Mayor of New Rochelle. New York. For the Art work "Lirismo Abstracto”. New York, USA. 1980.
 "Sylvia Daro Dawidowicz International Award”. South Florida, USA . 1982.
 Sculpture Award 85, Theater Teresa Carreño. Caracas, Venezuela . 1985.
 ”The Italy in the World Award “. Categories in Painting and Sculpture. Italy Roma-Caracas. 1998.
 "Mention of Honor" Venezuelan Army. Caracas, Venezuela.

Public project
 Art in the Public Squares, Miami, Florida USA 1980.
 Sculpture "Silver Points”. Caracas Metro. Station ‘s Subway "El Silencio”. Caracas, Venezuela. 1990.
 Sculpture "Convergenza dei Contrari". Public Square in Lago. Calabria, Italy. 1994.
 Sculpture "Interatracción" Simposium International of Sculpture in the Margarita' s Island. SIEIM. 2007.

Selected solo exhibitions
 Museum of Art Acarigua Araure. MAAA. "Wladimiro Politano of Oniric Metaphors and Abstract Syntheses". From 4 August until 4 November 2012. Acarigua, Venezuela. 2012
 Museum of Contemporary Art. Panamá. ”Politano. Un maestro italo-venezolano en Panamá". Panamá 2012
 Studio Politano " Politano, Alterities Immaginarie”. Caracas, Venezuela. 2008.
 Art Gallery Il mondo dell'Arte "Palazzo Margutta" Rome, Italia 2004.
 Art Gallery Dimaca. "Politano 1996–1998 ". Caracas, Venezuela 1998.
 Art Gallery Slato. Caracas, Venezuela 1997.
 Metro of Caracas. ”Permanent Exhibition " El Silencio. Caracas, Venezuela. 1993.
 Art Gallery Opere d' Arte. Spazi Pubblici. New York, USA 1992.
 Art Gallery El Mundo del Arte. Maracaibo, Venezuela 1987.
 Art Gallery Sami de Mizraji. Caracas, Venezuela 1981.
 Art Gallery Opera. Caracas, Venezuela 1979.
 Museum Kunstler Haus. Vienna-Austria 1978.
 Art Gallery Clay, Gallery of the year. New York, USA. 1977.
 Inter-American Development Bank, BID Washington D.C., USA 1976.
 Art Gallery Maison Bernard. "Politano" Caracas, Venezuela 1975.
 Art Gallery Maison Bernard. "Politano" Caracas, Venezuela 1974.
 Art Gallery Maison Bernard. "Politano" Caracas, Venezuela 1973.
 Art Gallery Maison Bernard. "Politano" Caracas, Venezuela 1972.
 Art Gallery Sans Souci. Caracas, Venezuela 1971.
 Art Gallery Bellas Artes. Caracas, Venezuela 1970.
 Art Gallery Artex Galeria International. Caracas, Venezuela 1969.
 Art Gallery La Isla, Paintings and Collages. Caracas, Venezuela 1968.
 Art Gallery El Muro, Politano. Caracas, Venezuela 1968.
 Venezuelan American Center. Caracas, Venezuela 1967.
 Palace of the Bruzzi. "Settanta Opere di Scenografia". Cosenza, Calabria Italy 1965.

Collective Art exhibitions
 Gallery Graphicart "36 Años de Geometría”. Caracas, Venezuela. Dic. 2012/March 2013.
 Palazzo Ca’ Zanardi. ”InternationArt in Venice". Venice, Italy. Oct. 2012.
 Swedish Parliament. ”Latin America Art”. Stockholm, Sweden. 2011.
 Palazzo Ca’ Zanardi. ”World Art in Venice". Venice, Italy. 2011.
 Canal Gallery " Temperatura Latina”. Panama. 2011.
 FIA 20 Years "Iberoamerican Art Fair Caracas”. Caracas, Venezuela. 2011.
Edsvik Konsthall. Stockholm, Sweden 2010.
 Art Gallery Dimaca. Caracas, Venezuela 2010.
 Art Gallery Medici, Caracas, Venezuela 2008.
 VII Biennale of National Art, Puerto la Cruz, Venezuela 2007.
 IV Fair of International Arts and Antique FIAAM, Venezuela 2007.
 I Simposium of Sculpture SIEIM, Island of Margarita, Venezuela 2007.
 Art Gallery Medici, Caracas, Venezuela 2007.
 Museum of Latin American Art, MOLAA, Long Beach, California, USA 2005.
 Art Gallery Joan Gaspar, Madrid, Espana 2005.
 Embassy of Canada, Caracas, Venezuela 2004.
 City Hall, Cosenza, Italy 2004.
 Edsvik Konsthall, Stockholm, Sweden 2004.
 Fair FIAAM, Maracaibo, Venezuela 2004.
 Vasby Konsthall, Stockholm, Sweden 2003.
 Art Gallery Dimaca. Caracas, Venezuela 2000.
 Art Gallery Slato. Caracas, Venezuela 1999.
 Art Gallery Slato. Caracas, Venezuela 1997.
 Art Gallery Slato. Caracas, Venezuela 1996.
 Art Gallery Uno. Caracas, Venezuela 1995.
 Art Gallery Theo. Madrid, Spain. 1991.
 Art Gallery Freites. Caracas, Venezuela 1990.
 Museum of Bellas Artes. Caracas, Venezuela 1987.
 Virginia Miller Art Gallery, Coral Gables, Florida, USA 1986.
 Art Biennale, Barquisimeto, Venezuela 1985.
 Cultural Center of Caracas. Teatro Teresa Carreño, Venezuela 1985
 FUNDARTE, Municipal Council and Government of the Federal District. Caracas, Venezuela 1985.
 Rotary Club International, New York, USA 1984.
 Art in public square, Miami, USA 1983.
 City Bank, Private Collection, Caracas, Venezuela 1983.
 Metropolitan Museum "International Masters" Coral Gables, Florida, USA 1983.
 Sala Mendoza, Caracas, Venezuela 1983.
 Art Space Gallery, Coral Gables, Florida, USA 1983.
 John and Koubeck Foundation, University of Miami, USA 1983.
 Sylvia Daro Dawidowicz International Foundation, Florida USA 1982.
 Viridiam Art Gallery, New York, USA 1982.
 Virginia Miller Art Gallery, Coral Gables, Florida, USA 1982.
 Art Foundation Concordia University. Concordia, USA 1981.
 Harmonie Club Foundation New York, USA 1980.
 Cultural Center of Art New Rochelle, New York, USA 1980.
 Elizabeth Weiner Art Gallery, New York, USA 1980.
 Clay Art Gallery, New York, USA 1977.
 David Finlay Art Gallery, New York, USA 1976.
 Randall Art Gallery, New York, USA 1976.
 XXIII Salon Arturo Michelena, Valencia, Venezuela 1970.
 Academy of Belle Arti di Roma, Italy 1965.

Public & Private collections
 Federal Bank. Mezerhane Group. Venezuela, Caracas.
 Private Collection Carlos Van Stuijvenberg. Caracas, Venezuela
 Museum of Latin American Art MOLAA, Long Beach, California. USA.
 Museum of Rende, Cosenza, Calabria, Italy.
 Museum Of Contemporary Art Sofia Imber, Caracas, Venezuela.
 Art Biennale, Island Of Margarita, Venezuela.
Rotary Club, New York, USA. City Bank,
 Private Collection, Miami, USA.
 Eugenio Mendoza Foundation, Caracas, Venezuela.
 University of Miami, Coral Gables, USA.
 Metropolitan Museum of Art Miami, USA.
 Cultural Center New Rochelle, New York, USA.
Bennington College, Vermont, USA.
 Kunstlerhaus Museum, Vienna, Austria.
Inter American Development Bank, Washington D.C., USA.
 Salon Arturo Michelena, Valencia Venezuela. Venezuela
 American Center, Caracas, Venezuela.
Palazzo Bruzzi, Cosenza, Italy.

References

External links
wladimiropolitano.com Official Website

1940 births
Living people
People from Caracas
Venezuelan sculptors
Venezuelan painters
Italian emigrants to Venezuela
Venezuelan expatriates in the United States